Micrurapteryx salicifoliella is a moth of the family Gracillariidae. It is known from Canada (Québec, Alberta, Saskatchewan, Manitoba, the Northwest Territories) and the United States (including Missouri, Ohio, Illinois, Minnesota, Alaska, Vermont, Kentucky, Michigan, Texas, California).

The wingspan is about 9 mm. Adults are on wing in mid to late July in Illinois, with a possibly a second generation emerging in October. In California, adults can be found from April to October and in Texas in November.

The larvae feed on Populus species (including Populus balsamifera, Populus tremuloides and Populus grandidentata) and Salix species (including Salix alba, Salix arbusculoides, Salix babylonica, Salix bebbiana, Salix brachycarpa, Salix exigua, Salix glauca, Salix integra, Salix interior, Salix lasiandra, Salix longifolia, Salix monticola, Salix novae-angliae, Salix planifolia and Salix scouleriana). They mine the leaves of their host plant. The mine is found on the upperside of the leaf, sometimes covering the entire leaf area. It is a flat upperside blotch, initially greenish but later turning brown. The larva chews a hole through the bottom of the mine and exits through it to pupate. The cocoon is often spun on the upperside of a leaf, parallel to its long axis.

References

External links
mothphotographersgroup
Micrurapteryx at microleps.org
Bug Guide

Gracillariinae
Moths described in 1872